Mohamed Hilmi (15 February 1931 – 5 January 2022) was an Algerian actor and director. He was the brother of actor Saïd Hilmi.

Life and career
Hilmi attended his first show, Diviser pour régner, at the age of 10. He left his hometown of Azzefoun at 13 years old to live in Algiers, where he began working for an insurance company. In 1947, he played a small role in the play Ould Ellil. Mahieddine Bachtarzi would only cast him into small roles, so Hilmi joined Rédha Falaki on the radio in 1949. However, he turned to the screen the following year, writing telefilms, short films, and medium-length films. He acted in his first feature film, El Ouelf Essaib.

Hilmi died in Algiers on 5 January 2022, at the age of 90.

Filmography

Actor
El Ouelf Essaib

Director
Chkoune yassbag
El Ghoumouk
Ec-Chitta
Matfahmine
Listihlak

Screenwriter
Démocra-cirque ou le cri du silence

References

1931 births
2022 deaths
20th-century Algerian male actors
Algerian film directors
Algerian male film actors
People from Azeffoun